The Transition EP is the follow-up to Christian rock band Philmont's full-length Attention, and their first release since parting ways with Forefront Records.  Philmont released the EP independently on October 19, 2010.  It is available via digital outlets such as iTunes, at Philmont concerts, and through Philmont's online merchandise store.

During the recording process, Philmont realized that they did not have sufficient funding to mix and master the six songs they had been working on.  They set up an online fundraiser via Kickstarter and set a goal of $4,000 toward which fans could pledge. In return, backers were offered exclusive rewards from the band (signed copies of the EP, bonus tracks, T-shirts, personalized videos, etc.) that got better with increasing investment amounts. Philmont surpassed their goal, and the fundraiser ended with $5,404 raised; they were able to release The Transition EP on October 19, as planned.

Track listing
All songs written by Scott Taube and Josiah Prince except where noted.

 "I Am" - 3:39
 "You Will Remain" (Taube/Prince/Allen Salmon) - 3:25
 "The Alchemist" - 3:36
 "Ringing In My Head" - (Taube/Prince/Salmon) - 3:15
 "Closer" - 3:43
 "The Last Song I Sing" (Taube/Prince/Tony Wood) - 3:39

Bonus tracks for Kickstarter donors
 "Closer (Acoustic)"
 "Shuttle Launch (Demo)"

Personnel
Philmont
Scott Taube - lead vocals
Josiah Prince - guitar, keyboards, programming, vocals, additional production
Justin Sams - guitar, vocals, gang vocals
Josh Guion - bass guitar
Jeremi Hough - drums, percussion, gang vocals

Additional personnel
Matthew Arcaini - production, programming, gang vocals
Jordan Messer - gang vocals
Matt Underwood - acoustic guitar (track 2)
Lee Bridges (mixing, tracks 1, 3, & 5)
Ainslie Grosser (mixing, track 2)
Allen Salmon (mixing, tracks 4 & 6)
Dan Shike - mastering

Music videos

References

External links
 Philmont's MySpace Page
 Purchase The Transition EP via Philmont's online store
 The Transition EP Kickstarter fundraiser page

2010 EPs
Philmont (band) albums
Kickstarter-funded albums